Frunză is a town in Ocnița district, Moldova.

Cities and towns in Moldova
Ocnița District